State Highway 224 (SH 224) is a  state highway in Adams County, Colorado, United States, that connects U.S. Route 36 (US 36) on the Sherrelwood–Twin Lakes line with U.S. Route 6/U.S. Route 85 (US 6/US 85) in Commerce City. SH 224 is locally signed as East 70th Avenue and East 74th Avenue.

Route description
SH 224 begins at Broadway's three-ramp interchange with US 36 (Denver–Boulder Turnpike) just west of US 36's interchange with Interstate 25 and I-270 (Dwight D. Eisenhower Highway); there is no ramp from Broadway to eastbound US 36. SH 224 heads south along four-lane undivided Broadway through the unincorporated area of Twin Lakes. At Broadway's intersection with 70th Street, SH 224 turns east onto 70th Street; SH 53 begins at the intersection and heads south along Broadway. SH 224 heads east on 70th Street as a four-lane divided highway that has a partial interchange with I-25 allowing access to I-25 to and from Denver; the route also intersects a ramp toward Denver for the I-25 express lanes.

SH 224 continues into unincorporated Welby and curves northeast parallel to Clear Creek, reduces to two lanes, and passes under I-270 with no access. The route briefly expands to a four-lane divided highway around its intersection with York Street, where the route continues as 74th Street and veers away from Clear Creek. East of its bridge across the South Platte River north of its confluence with Clear Creek, SH 224 expands to a four-lane divided highway and crosses over the Regional Transportation District (RTD) N line rail line within its partial interchange with I-76, which allows access to I-76 to and from Denver. The highway enters the city of Commerce City and intersects Colorado Boulevard, which leads to the N Line's Commerce City/72nd station, on its way to its eastern terminus at US 6 and US 85 (Vasquez Boulevard).

Major intersections

See also

 List of state highways in Colorado

References

External links

224
Transportation in Adams County, Colorado